Peter Adelaar (26 February 1947 – 14 October 2004) was a Dutch judoka. Between 1973 and 1980 he won one gold and five bronze medals at European championships. He competed at the 1980 Summer Olympics in the heavyweight and open categories and finished in 10th and 15th place, respectively.

References

External links
 

Dutch male judoka
1947 births
2004 deaths
Judoka at the 1980 Summer Olympics
Olympic judoka of the Netherlands
Sportspeople from Amsterdam
20th-century Dutch people